The Guild of St Matthew was an English high-church Christian socialist association led by Stewart Headlam from its establishment in Bethnal Green on 29 June 1877 when Headlam was Curate at St Matthew's to its dissolution in 1909. While the guild never had a membership of more than about 400 people, it was "the pioneer Christian socialist society of the revival period in Britain", breaking the ground for other Christian socialist organisations yet to come, such as the Christian Social Union. Kenneth Leech described it as "the first explicitly socialist group in Britain". For many years, it published the periodical The Church Reformer.

See also 

 Anglo-Catholicism
 Charles Kingsley
 Charles Marson
 Frederick Denison Maurice

References

Footnotes

Bibliography

Further reading 

 

1877 establishments in England
1909 disestablishments in England
Anglican socialism
Christian organisations based in the United Kingdom
Christian socialist organizations
Church of England societies and organisations
Organizations disestablished in 1909
Religious organizations established in 1877